Gotham Knights is an American superhero television series developed by Natalie Abrams, Chad Fiveash, and James Stoteraux for the CW. It centers on members of the Batman family and other DC Comics supporting characters. It premiered on March 14, 2023.

Premise
In the wake of Bruce Wayne's death, his adopted son Turner Hayes forges an unlikely alliance with runaways Harper and Cullen Row and criminal Duela when they are all accused of a murder they didn't commit by district attorney Harvey Dent. These kids work in an attempt to clear their names and find out who really killed Bruce Wayne which leads to them learning about the Court of Owls.

Cast

Main

 Oscar Morgan as Turner Hayes, Bruce Wayne's adoptive son who is alleged to have hired the three people who have been framed for killing Bruce Wayne. Turner Hayes is an original character for the series and does not come from the comics.
 Olivia Rose Keegan as Duela, the daughter of the late Joker who is among those framed for Bruce Wayne's murder.
 Navia Robinson as Carrie Kelley / Robin, the current sidekick of Batman who allies with Turner to find the true culprits of Batman's murder.
 Fallon Smythe as Harper Row, a young streetwise engineer and Cullen's sister who is among those framed for Bruce Wayne's murder.
 Tyler DiChiara as Cullen Row, Harper's brother who is among those framed for Bruce Wayne's murder.
 Anna Lore as Stephanie Brown who is Turner's best friend and an expert coder. She allies with Turner to help find the true culprits of Batman's murder.
 Rahart Adams as Brody March, the son of Lincoln March and a classmate of Turner, Carrie, and Stephanie at Gotham Academy.
 Misha Collins as Harvey Dent, a district attorney who is a friend of Bruce Wayne.

Recurring
 Damon Dayoub as Lincoln March, the father of Brody March
 Lauren Stamile as Rebecca March, the mother of Brody March
 Ethan Embry as Arthur Brown / Cluemaster, the father of Stephanie Brown
 Sunny Mabrey as Crystal Brown, the mother of Stephanie Brown
 Doug Bradley as Joe Chill

Guest
 K.K. Moggie as Cressida, a woman who watches over Turner when Bruce is busy.
 Joel Keller as Detective Ford, a detective of the Gotham City Police Department working for Harvey Dent who is among the police officers that tried to kill Turner and the suspects of Bruce Wayne's death. He is later beheaded by a mysterious figure.
 Fiona Byrne as Commissioner Yindel, the commissioner of the Gotham City Police Department.
 David Miller as Bruce Wayne / Batman, the CEO of Wayne Enterprises, adoptive father of Turner, and the vigilante Batman, who was found murdered

Episodes

Production

Development
In December 2021, it was reported that a television series adaptation was in development at The CW. The series is currently being written by Natalie Abrams, James Stoteraux, and Chad Fiveash, all of whom also serve as executive producers with Greg Berlanti, Sarah Schechter, and David Madden through Berlanti Productions. The video game of the same title also takes place in a post-Bruce Wayne Gotham and also features the Court of Owls as antagonists, but the projects are unrelated. In February 2022, The CW ordered a pilot episode to evaluate. In May 2022, The CW picked up Gotham Knights to series.

Casting
In March 2022, Fallon Smythe and Tyler DiChiara were cast for the pilot, followed by Oscar Morgan, Olivia Rose Keegan, and Navia Robinson shortly afterward. Misha Collins revealed that he would portray Harvey Dent. Anna Lore also joined the cast, portraying Stephanie Brown. In April, Rahart Adams was cast as Brody, whose parents were cast in recurring roles for Lauren Stamile and Damon Dayoub after the pilot was picked up to series. In January 2023, Ethan Embry and Sunny Mabrey were cast in recurring capacities as Cluemaster and Crystal Brown. In March 2023, Doug Bradley joined the cast in a recurring role as Joe Chill, with Bradley indicating that he was a fan of Batman but was unaware of who Joe Chill was in the Batman mythology.

Filming
Filming for the pilot episode began in April 2022 throughout the streets of Toronto. Filming for the rest of the season began on September 13, 2022.

Release
The first trailer was released on May 31, 2022. The series premiered on March 14, 2023.

Reception

Critical response
On review aggregator Rotten Tomatoes, the series has an approval rating of 18% with an average rating of 4.7/10, based on 11 critic reviews. The website's critics consensus reads, "Never send amateurs to do a Batman's job." On Metacritic, it has a weighted average score of 42 out of 100 based on 4 critic reviews, indicating "mixed or average reviews".

Ratings

References

External links
 

2023 American television series debuts
2020s American crime drama television series
American superhero television series
Batman television series
English-language television shows
Television series by Warner Bros. Television Studios
Television shows based on DC Comics
Television shows filmed in Toronto
The CW original programming
Television series about adoption
Murder in television